James Stuart Holden (January 29, 1914 – November 18, 1996) was an American attorney and judge. He served as an associate justice and chief justice of the Vermont Supreme Court and later as a judge of the United States District Court for the District of Vermont.

Early life
Born in Bennington, Vermont, Holden received an AB degree from Dartmouth College in 1935 and an LL.B. from Albany Law School in 1938. He was in private practice in Bennington from 1938 to 1941.

Military service
Holden was in the United States Army during World War II, serving from 1941 to 1945, achieving the rank of major while serving in the Pacific Theater as a member of the 43rd Infantry Division's 172nd Infantry Regiment.  He remained in the military after the war, and was executive officer of the Vermont Army National Guard's 1st Battalion, 172nd Infantry Regiment until resigning in 1948.  In 1949, he was appointed inspector general of the National Guard's 43rd Infantry Division and promoted to lieutenant colonel.  He resigned again in 1950.

Continued career
He returned to private practice in Bennington from 1945 to 1948, and was also state's attorney of Bennington County from 1947 to 1948. He was Chairman of the Vermont Public Service Commission from 1948 to 1949.

State judge
Holden was a judge of the Vermont Superior Court from 1949 to 1956, and then succeeded Paul A. Chase as an associate justice of the Vermont Supreme Court.  He served until 1963, when he succeeded Benjamin N. Hulburd as chief justice. He was succeeded by Harold C. Sylvester, and served as chief justice until 1972, when he was succeeded by Percival L. Shangraw.

Federal judicial service
On November 11, 1971, Holden was nominated by President Richard Nixon to a seat on the United States District Court for the District of Vermont vacated by Judge James L. Oakes. Holden was confirmed by the United States Senate on November 23, 1971, and received his commission on November 30, 1971. He served as Chief Judge from 1972 to 1983, assuming senior status on January 29, 1984. Holden served in that capacity until his death.

Death and burial
Holden died in Longwood, Florida on November 18, 1996. He was buried at Park Lawn Cemetery in Bennington.

References

External links
 
 

1914 births
1996 deaths
People from Bennington, Vermont
Dartmouth College alumni
Albany Law School alumni
Vermont lawyers
State's attorneys in Vermont
Vermont state court judges
Justices of the Vermont Supreme Court
Chief Justices of the Vermont Supreme Court
Judges of the United States District Court for the District of Vermont
United States district court judges appointed by Richard Nixon
20th-century American judges
United States Army officers
United States Army personnel of World War II
Burials in Vermont
20th-century American lawyers